Sartang may refer to:
Sartang River, in Russia
Sartang language, native to India
Sar Tang (disambiguation), various places in Iran